The  is a modernized Vietnamese national garment. Besides suits and dresses nowadays, men and women can also wear áo dài on formal occasions. It is a long, split tunic worn over silk trousers.  translates as shirt and  means "long". The term can be used to describe any clothing attire that consists of a long tunic, such as "nhật bình".

The predecessor of the áo dài was derived by the Nguyễn lords in Phú Xuân during 18th century. This outfit was derived from the áo ngũ thân, a five-piece dress commonly worn in the 19th and early 20th centuries. The áo dài was later made to be form-fitting which was influenced by the French, Nguyễn Cát Tường and other Hanoi artists redesigned the áo dài as a modern dress in the 1920s and 1930s. The updated look was promoted by the artists and magazines of Tự Lực văn đoàn (Self-Reliant Literary Group) as a national costume for the modern era. In the 1950s, Saigon designers tightened the fit to produce the version worn by Vietnamese women. The áo dài dress for women was extremely popular in South Vietnam in the 1960s and early 1970s.

The áo dài dress has traditionally been marketed with a feminine appeal, with "Miss Ao Dai" pageants being popular in Vietnam and with overseas Vietnamese. However, the men version of áo dài or modified áo dài are also worn during weddings or formal occasions. The áo dài is one of the few Vietnamese words that appear in English-language dictionaries. The áo dài can be paired with the nón lá or the khăn vấn.

Parts of dress 

Tà sau: back flap
Nút bấm thân áo: hooks used as fasteners and holes
Ống tay: sleeve
Đường bên: inside seam
Nút móc kết thúc: main hook and hole
 Tà trước: front flap
 Khuy cổ: collar button
 Cổ áo: collar
 Đường may: seam
 Kích (eo): waist

Origin

Switch to trousers (18th century) 

For centuries, peasant women typically wore a halter top underneath a blouse or overcoat, alongside a skirt (váy). Aristocrats, on the other hand, favored a cross-collared robe called áo giao lĩnh. When the Ming dynasty occupied Đại Việt during the Fourth Era of Northern Domination in 1407, it forced the women to wear Chinese-style pants. The following Lê dynasty also criticized women for violating Confucian dress norms, but only enforced the dress code haphazardly, so skirts and halter tops remained the norm. During the 17th and 18th centuries, Vietnam was divided into northern and southern realms, with the Nguyễn lords ruling the south. To distinguish the southern people from the northerners, in 1744, Lord Nguyễn Phúc Khoát of Huế decreed that both men and women at his court wear trousers and a gown with buttons down the front. The members of the southern court were thus distinguished from the courtiers of the Trịnh Lords in Hanoi, who wore áo giao lĩnh with long skirts.

According to Lê Quý Đôn's record in the book "Phủ Biên Tạp Lục" (recording most of the important information about the economy and society of Đàng Trong for nearly 200 years), the áo dài (or rather, the forerunner of the áo dài) created by Lord Nguyễn Phúc Khoát based on Chinese Ming Dynasty costumes, by how to learn the method of making costumes in the book "Sāncái Túhuì" as the standard.

19th century 
The áo ngũ thân (five part dress) had two flaps sewn together in the back, two flaps sewn together in the front, and a "baby flap" hidden underneath the main front flap. The gown appeared to have two-flaps with slits on both sides, features preserved in the later áo dài. Compared to a modern áo dài, the front and back flaps were much broader and the fit looser and much shorter. It had a high collar and was buttoned in the same fashion as a modern áo dài. Women could wear the dress with the top few buttons undone, revealing a glimpse of their yếm underneath.

20th century

Modernization of style 

Huế's Đồng Khánh Girl's High School, which opened in 1917, was widely praised for the áo dài uniform worn by its students. The first modernized áo dài appeared at a Paris fashion show in 1921. In 1930, Hanoi artist Cát Tường, also known as Le Mur, designed a dress inspired by the áo ngũ thân and by Paris fashions. It reached to the floor and fit the curves of the body by using darts and a nipped-in waist. When fabric became inexpensive, the rationale for multiple layers and thick flaps disappeared. Modern textile manufacture allows for wider panels, eliminating the need to sew narrow panels together. The áo dài Le Mur, or "trendy" ao dai, created a sensation when model Nguyễn Thị Hậu wore it for a feature published by the newspaper Today in January 1935. The style was promoted by the artists of Tự Lực văn đoàn ("Self-Reliant Literary Group") as a national costume for the modern era. The painter Lê Phô introduced several popular styles of ao dai beginning in 1934. Such Westernized garments temporarily disappeared during World War II (1939–45).

In the 1950s, Saigon (now Ho Chi Minh City) designers tightened the fit of the áo dài to create the version commonly seen today. Trần Kim of Thiết Lập Tailors and Dũng of Dũng Tailors created a dress with raglan sleeves and a diagonal seam that runs from the collar to the underarm. Madame Nhu, first lady of South Vietnam, popularized a collarless version beginning in 1958. The áo dài was most popular from 1960 to 1975. A brightly colored áo dài hippy was introduced in 1968. The áo dài mini, a version designed for practical use and convenience, had slits that extended above the waist and panels that reached only to the knee.

Communist period 
The áo dài has always been more common in the South than in the North. The communists, who gained power in the North in 1954 and in the South in 1975, had conflicted feelings about the áo dài. They praised it as a national costume and one was worn to the Paris Peace Conference (1969–73) by Viet Cong negotiator Nguyễn Thị Bình. Yet Westernized versions of the dress and those associated with "decadent" Saigon (Ho Chi Minh City) of the 1960s and early 1970s were condemned. Economic crisis, famine, and war with Cambodia combined to make the 1980s a fashion low point. The áo dài was rarely worn except at weddings and other formal occasions, with the older, looser-fitting style preferred. Overseas Vietnamese, meanwhile, kept tradition alive with "Miss Ao Dai" pageants (Hoa Hậu Áo Dài), the most notable one held annually in Long Beach, California.

The áo dài experienced a revival beginning in late 1980s, when state enterprise and schools began adopting the dress as a uniform again. In 1989, 16,000 Vietnamese attended a Miss Ao Dai Beauty Contest held in Ho Chi Minh City. When the Miss International Pageant in Tokyo gave its "Best National Costume" award to an áo dài-clad Trường Quỳnh Mai in 1995, Thời Trang Trẻ (New Fashion Magazine) claimed that Vietnam's "national soul" was "once again honored". An "áo dài craze" followed that lasted for several years and led to wider use of the dress as a school uniform.

Present day 

No longer deemed politically controversial, áo dài fashion design is supported by the Vietnamese government. It is often called áo dài Việt Nam to link it to patriotic feelings. Designer Le Si Hoang is a celebrity in Vietnam and his shop in Ho Chi Minh City is the place to visit for those who admire the dress. In Hanoi, tourists get fitted with áo dài on Luong Van Can Street. The elegant city of Huế in the central region is known for its áo dài, nón lá, and well-dressed women.

The áo dài is now a standard for weddings, for celebrating Tết and for other formal occasions. It is the required uniform for female teachers (mostly from high school to below) and female students in common high schools in the South; there is no requirement for color or pattern for teachers while students use plain white or with some small patterns like flowers for use as school uniforms. Companies often require their female staff to wear uniforms that include the áo dài, so flight attendants, receptionists, bank female staff, restaurant staff, and hotel workers in Vietnam may be seen wearing it.

The most popular style of áo dài fits tightly around the wearer's upper torso, emphasizing her bust and curves. Although the dress covers the entire body, it is thought to be provocative, especially when it is made of thin fabric. "The áo dài covers everything, but hides nothing", according to one saying. The dress must be individually fitted and usually requires several weeks for a tailor to complete. An ao dai costs about $200 in the United States and about $40 in Vietnam.

"Symbolically, the áo dài invokes nostalgia and timelessness associated with a gendered image of the homeland for which many Vietnamese people throughout the diaspora yearn," wrote Nhi T. Lieu, an assistant professor at the University of Texas at Austin. The difficulties of working while wearing an ao dai link the dress to frailty and innocence, she wrote. Vietnamese writers who favor the use of the áo dài as a school uniform cite the inconvenience of wearing it as an advantage, a way of teaching students feminine behavior such as modesty, caution, and a refined manner.

The áo dài is featured in an array of Asian-themed or related movies. In Good Morning, Vietnam (1987), Robin Williams's character is wowed by áo dài-clad women when he first arrives in Ho Chi Minh City. The 1992 films Indochine and The Lover inspired several international fashion houses to design áo dài collections, including Prada's SS08 collection and a Georgio Armani collection. In the Vietnamese film The White Silk Dress (2007), an áo dài is the sole legacy that the mother of a poverty-stricken family has to pass on to her daughters. The Hanoi City Complex, a 65-story building now under construction, will have an áo dài-inspired design. Vietnamese designers created áo dài for the contestants in the Miss Universe beauty contest, which was held July 2008 in Nha Trang, Vietnam.
The most prominent annual Ao Dai Festival outside of Vietnam is held each year in San Jose, California, a city that is home to a large Vietnamese American community. This event features an international array of designer áo dài under the direction of festival founder, Jenny Do.

In recent years, a shorter, more modern version of the áo dài, known as the áo dài cách tân, is often worn by the younger generation. This modern áo dài has a shorter front and back flap, hitting just below the knees.

Gallery

See also 

 Culture of Vietnam
 Vietnamese clothing
 Cheongsam

Notes

References

Bibliography

Further reading

External links 

 History of the Vietnamese Long Dress
 The Evolution of the Ao Dai Through Many Eras, Gia Long Alumni Association of Seattle, 2000
 Vietnam: Mini-Skirts & Ao-Dais. A video that shows what the women of Saigon wore in 1968

Dresses
History of Asian clothing
Folk costumes
Vietnamese clothing
Vietnamese words and phrases